Becher Robert Gale (April 14, 1887 – August 24, 1950) was a Canadian rower who competed in the 1908 Summer Olympics. He was the member of the Canadian boat that won the bronze medal in the coxless four event. He was also a crew member of the Canadian boat that won the bronze medal in the eight event.

References

External links
Becher Gale's profile at databaseOlympics
Becher Gale's profile at Sports Reference.com

1887 births
1950 deaths
Canadian male rowers
Olympic rowers of Canada
Rowers at the 1908 Summer Olympics
Rowers at the 1912 Summer Olympics
Olympic bronze medalists for Canada
Olympic medalists in rowing
Medalists at the 1908 Summer Olympics
20th-century Canadian people